Gaston Defferre (14 September 1910 – 7 May 1986) was a French Socialist politician.  He served as mayor of Marseille for 33 years until his death in 1986. He was  minister for overseas territories in Guy Mollet’s socialist government in 1956–1957.  His main achievement was to establish the framework used to grant independence to France’s African territories. As the Socialist candidate for president in 1969, he received only 5 percent of the vote. He was much more successful in promoting François Mitterrand as leader of the Socialist Party (Parti Socialiste; PS) in 1971. He held a series of ministerial portfolios after the Socialist victory in 1981, especially as minister of state for the interior and decentralization.

Biography
A lawyer and member of the French Section of the Workers' International (SFIO), Defferre was involved in the Brutus Network, a Resistance Socialist group, during World War II. A long-standing member of the National Assembly (1945–1958, 1962–1986) and member of the Senate (1959–1962), he also served  for many years as mayor of Marseille (1944–1945, 1953–1986). He was a formidable political force in the South-East, where he owned the major centre-left newspaper Le Provençal (which he co-founded at the Liberation) and later acquired the right-wing daily Le Méridional. 

Defferre served as Merchant Marine Minister (1950–1952), then Overseas Minister (1956–1957), and laid the groundwork for the end of French colonialism in sub-Saharan Africa through Loi-cadre Defferre.

In his region, he faced a strong French Communist Party (PCF) with which he was frequently in conflict. As mayor, he relied on the support of the non-Gaullist center-right in the municipal assembly. In the same way, he advocated a national alliance between the SFIO and the Christian democratic Popular Republican Movement (MRP). Before the 1965 presidential election, L'Express published an identikit of the best center-left candidate under the name of "Mister X". It corresponded with  Defferre's profile (L'Express co-founder Jean-Jacques Servan-Schreiber being a well known advocate of a Third Force alliance of socialists, Christian democrats and Radicals). But, failing to create an SFIO-MRP-Radical Party federation, Defferre had to give way to François Mitterrand, whose preferred strategy for the Socialists was the formation of a left-wing coalition including the PCF. His political career was strongly supported by members of the Corsican mafia, not least the Guérini clan.

Defferre was a participant in the last duel in France that took place in 1967 when Defferre insulted René Ribière at the French parliament and was subsequently challenged to a duel fought with swords. Defferre yelled ‘Taisez-vous, abruti!‘ (‘Shut up, stupid!’) at Ribière following an argument in the French National Assembly. Ribière demanded an apology, Defferre refused, so Ribière demanded satisfaction by duel. René Ribière lost the duel, having been wounded twice. He escaped relatively uninjured, however.

In 1969 Defferre was the Socialist candidate once again for the French presidency. This time he had the support of ex-Premier Pierre Mendès-France, who would have been Premier again had Defferre been elected. But he was soundly defeated, suffering from the polarisation of French politics following the events of May 1968, scoring only 5% of the vote, the lowest ever score for a French Socialist candidate. The failure of Defferre prompted the birth of the new Socialist Party (PS) and buried the idea of an alliance with the centre-right. 

Having been the main opponent of Guy Mollet in the party, and leader of the Socialist group in the National Assembly, Defferre helped Mitterrand take the leadership during the Epinay Congress (1971), in spite of his reservations concerning Mitterrand's strategy of an alliance with the Communists. Later, when Mitterrand became President, Defferre served as Mitterrand's interior minister from 1981 to 1984. He was the architect of the 1982 decentralization reforms. Town and Country Planning Minister until 1986, he died in office as Mayor of Marseille. His widow, Edmonde Charles-Roux, was president of the literary circle the Académie Goncourt.

Political mandates

Governmental functions
Secretary of State for Information : January–June 1946.
Undersecretary of State for Overseas France : 1946–1947.
Minister of Merchant Marine : 1950–1951 / March–August 1951.
Minister of Overseas France : 1956–1957.
Minister of State, Minister of Interior and Decentralization : 1981–1983.
Minister of Interior and Decentralization : 1983–1984.
Minister of State, Minister of Planning and Land Development : 1984–1986.

Electoral mandates

National Assembly of France
Member of the National Assembly of France for Bouches-du-Rhône : 1945–1958 / 1962–1981 (Became minister in 1981) / March–May 1986 (He died in 1986). Elected in 1945, reelected in June 1946, November 1946, 1951, 1956, 1962, 1967, 1968, 1973, 1978, 1981, 1986.

Senate of France
Senator of Bouches-du-Rhône : 1959–1962 (Reelected member of the National Assembly of France in 1962). Elected in 1959.

Municipal Council
Mayor of Marseille : 1944–1945 / 1953–1986 (He died in 1986). Reelected in 1953, 1959, 1965, 1971, 1977, 1983.
Municipal councillor of Marseille : 1944–1945 / 1953–1986 (He died in 1986). Reelected in 1953, 1959, 1965, 1971, 1977, 1983.

Notes

Further reading
 Naylor, Edward Walter James. "A system that resembles both colonialism and the invasion of France: Gaston Defferre and the politics of immigration in 1973." in France and the Mediterranean: international relations, culture and politics (Peter Lang International Academic Publishers, 2012) pp. 249-273.
 Shipway, Martin. "Gaston Defferre’s Loi-Cadre and its application, 1956/57: Last chance for a French African ‘empire-state’ or blueprint for decolonisation?." in Francophone Africa at fifty (Manchester University Press, 2015_.
 Unger, Gérard. Gaston Defferre (2011), Biography in French.

External links

1910 births
1986 deaths
People from Hérault
French Protestants
Politicians from Occitania (administrative region)
French Section of the Workers' International politicians
Socialist Party (France) politicians
French Ministers of Overseas France
French interior ministers
French Ministers of Merchant Marine
State ministers of France
Government ministers of France
Members of the Constituent Assembly of France (1945)
Members of the Constituent Assembly of France (1946)
Deputies of the 1st National Assembly of the French Fourth Republic
Deputies of the 2nd National Assembly of the French Fourth Republic
Deputies of the 3rd National Assembly of the French Fourth Republic
French Senators of the Fifth Republic
Senators of Bouches-du-Rhône
Deputies of the 2nd National Assembly of the French Fifth Republic
Deputies of the 3rd National Assembly of the French Fifth Republic
Deputies of the 4th National Assembly of the French Fifth Republic
Deputies of the 5th National Assembly of the French Fifth Republic
Deputies of the 6th National Assembly of the French Fifth Republic
Deputies of the 7th National Assembly of the French Fifth Republic
Deputies of the 8th National Assembly of the French Fifth Republic
Mayors of Marseille
French anti-communists
Aix-Marseille University alumni
French Resistance members
French people of the Algerian War
French duellists